Gert-Åke Bengtsson (born 13 June 1948) is a Swedish former sports shooter. He competed in the skeet event at the 1972 Summer Olympics.

References

External links
 

1948 births
Living people
Swedish male sport shooters
Olympic shooters of Sweden
Shooters at the 1972 Summer Olympics
People from Eslöv Municipality
Sportspeople from Skåne County